Zhyttia v Bordo is a live cassette by Vopli Vidopliassova. It was released in 1995.

Track list 

This tape contains a performance of the old song Uga-ga, which was renamed Uvaga (Warning) and recorded by Borshch.

1995 live albums
Vopli Vidopliassova albums